Gary Rowell, known as "Gorgeous" Gary Royal, is an American professional wrestler. In the early part of his career, he was a member of the Convertible Blonds, a heel stable with Rip Rogers and Pistol Pez Whatley.

Championships and accomplishments
Central States Wrestling
NWA Central States Television Championship (1 time)
National Wrestling Alliance
NWA World Junior Heavyweight Championship (1 time)
Pro Wrestling Federation
PWF Intercontinental Championship (1 time)
PWF Junior Heavyweight Championship (1 time)
PWF Tag Team Champion (3 times) – with Flaming Youth (2) and Cruel Connection II
Southern Championship Wrestling
SCW Heavyweight Championship (1 time)
Other titles
CCW Heavyweight Championship (1 time)

References

External links

Living people
People from China Grove, North Carolina
American male professional wrestlers
Professional wrestlers from North Carolina
Year of birth missing (living people)
20th-century professional wrestlers